Shoal Lake 39A is a First Nations reserve straddling the border of Manitoba and Ontario on the shores of Shoal Lake. It is one of the reserves of the Iskatewizaagegan 39 Independent First Nation.

References

Saulteaux reserves in Ontario
Communities in Kenora District
Indian reserves in Eastman Region, Manitoba